A chess piece is a game piece for playing a game of chess on a chess board.

Chess piece may also refer to:

Chess Pieces (MÄR), a fictional organization in the anime and manga series MÄR: Märchen Awakens Romance
"Chesspiece", a song by Chinese singer Faye Wong, from the 1994 album Sky

See also
Chess (disambiguation)